Metageria is a cutaneous condition characterized by premature aging.

See also 
 Hutchinson–Gilford syndrome
 List of cutaneous conditions

References

External links 

Genodermatoses
Genetic disorders with OMIM but no gene